Miroslav Kadlec (born 22 June 1964) is a Czech former professional football defender.

During his career, Kadlec played for four Czech clubs, and also had an eight-year stint with Bundesliga's 1. FC Kaiserslautern, where he was crowned league champion in 1991 and 1998, the second straight out of the second division.

Kadlec played for Czechoslovakia and later the Czech Republic; for both he played a total of 64 matches and scored two goals. He took part in the 1990 FIFA World Cup, played the full ninety minutes in the nation's five matches. Six years later he led the Czech national football team on its way to the 1996 UEFA European Football Championship silver, where he missed only one game because of a two yellow card-suspension.

His son Michal is also a professional footballer.

Honours

Club
1. FC Kaiserslautern
 Bundesliga champion: 1990–91, 1997–98
 DFB-Pokal winner: 1995–96

International
Czech Republic
 UEFA European Football Championship runner-up: 1996

References

External links
 
 

1964 births
Living people
People from Uherské Hradiště
Czechoslovak footballers
Czech footballers
Czech First League players
MFK Vítkovice players
FK Hvězda Cheb players
FC Zbrojovka Brno players
1. FC Kaiserslautern players
Bundesliga players
2. Bundesliga players
Expatriate footballers in Germany
1990 FIFA World Cup players
UEFA Euro 1996 players
Association football defenders
Czech Republic international footballers
Czechoslovakia international footballers
Dual internationalists (football)
Czechoslovak expatriate footballers
Czech expatriate footballers
Czechoslovak expatriate sportspeople in West Germany
Czech expatriate sportspeople in Germany
FK Drnovice players
Sportspeople from the Zlín Region
Expatriate footballers in West Germany